Crocus candidus  is a species of flowering plant in the genus Crocus of the family Iridaceae. It is a cormous perennial native to Turkey.

It is found growing in woods and scrub, with flowering occurring in February and March.

Plants produce one or two very wide leaves, the much divided styles are yellow-orange.

References

candidus